Gamagori Choseichi Dam(蒲郡調整池) is a rockfill dam located in Aichi Prefecture in Japan. The dam is used for irrigation and water supply. The catchment area of the dam is 0.8 km2. The dam impounds about 5  ha of land when full and can store 612 thousand cubic meters of water. The construction of the dam was started on 1977 and completed in 1996.

References

Dams in Aichi Prefecture
1996 establishments in Japan